Against the Wind may refer to:

 Against the Wind (album), a 1980 album by Bob Seger
 "Against the Wind" (Bob Seger song)
 "Against the Wind" (Bonnie Tyler song), 1991
 "Against the Wind" (Máire Brennan song), 1991
 Against the Wind (1948 film), a Ealing Studios World War II film
 Against the Wind (1990 film), a Spanish incest-themed drama film
 Controvento, an Italian film from 2000 which is known as Against the Wind in English
 Against the Wind (miniseries), a 1978 Australian television mini-series
 Against the Wind (soundtrack), a soundtrack album from the series, by Jon English and Mario Millo 
 "Against the Wind", an episode of 2011 animated Italian-German TV series Mia and Me

See also 
 Into the Wind (disambiguation)